State Route 128 (SR 128) is part of Maine's systems of numbered state highways, running from SR 127 in Woolwich, passing SR 197 in Dresden, and ending at SR 27 at Dresden.

Route description
SR 128 begins at SR 127 in Woolwich. It heads northwest, running parallel with the Kennebec River. It proceeds northward to SR 197 in Dresden, and then, it heads further north and then east towards its northern terminus at SR 27 at Dresden.

History
SR 128 was created in 1925 and originally ran between Wiscasset and Boothbay Harbor. In 1926, the road was realigned to its present location.

Junction list

References

128
Transportation in Sagadahoc County, Maine
Transportation in Lincoln County, Maine